Petukhovo is the name of several inhabited localities in Russia.

Modern localities
Urban localities
Petukhovo (town), Kurgan Oblast, a town in Petukhovsky District of Kurgan Oblast

Rural localities
Petukhovo, Arkhangelsk Oblast, a village in Pavlovsky Selsoviet of Vilegodsky District in Arkhangelsk Oblast
Petukhovo, Ivanovo Oblast, a village in Savinsky District of Ivanovo Oblast
Petukhovo, Kirov Oblast, a village in Salobelyaksky Rural Okrug of Yaransky District in Kirov Oblast; 
Petukhovo (rural locality), Kurgan Oblast, a selo in Petukhovsky Selsoviet of Petukhovsky District in Kurgan Oblast
Petukhovo, Mari El Republic, a village in Mikryakovsky Rural Okrug of Gornomariysky District in the Mari El Republic
Petukhovo, Bor, Nizhny Novgorod Oblast, a village in Kantaurovsky Selsoviet under the administrative jurisdiction of the town of oblast significance of Bor in Nizhny Novgorod Oblast
Petukhovo, Fedurinsky Selsoviet, Gorodetsky District, Nizhny Novgorod Oblast, a village in Fedurinsky Selsoviet of Gorodetsky District in Nizhny Novgorod Oblast
Petukhovo, Kovriginsky Selsoviet, Gorodetsky District, Nizhny Novgorod Oblast, a village in Kovriginsky Selsoviet of Gorodetsky District in Nizhny Novgorod Oblast
Petukhovo, Novgorod Oblast, a village in Peredskoye Settlement of Borovichsky District in Novgorod Oblast
Petukhovo, Kochyovsky District, Perm Krai, a village in Kochyovsky District of Perm Krai
Petukhovo, Yusvinsky District, Perm Krai, a village in Yusvinsky District of Perm Krai
Petukhovo (railway crossing loop), Tomsky District, Tomsk Oblast, a railway crossing loop in Tomsky District of Tomsk Oblast
Petukhovo (selo), Tomsky District, Tomsk Oblast, a selo in Tomsky District of Tomsk Oblast
Petukhovo, Tver Oblast, a village in Stoyantsevskoye Rural Settlement of Kimrsky District in Tver Oblast
Petukhovo, Balezinsky District, Udmurt Republic, a village in Kirshonsky Selsoviet of Balezinsky District in the Udmurt Republic
Petukhovo, Mozhginsky District, Udmurt Republic, a selo in Pychassky Selsoviet of Mozhginsky District in the Udmurt Republic
Petukhovo, Vladimir Oblast, a village in Kirzhachsky District of Vladimir Oblast
Petukhovo, Babushkinsky District, Vologda Oblast, a village in Yurkinsky Selsoviet of Babushkinsky District in Vologda Oblast
Petukhovo, Totemsky District, Vologda Oblast, a village in Kalininsky Selsoviet of Totemsky District in Vologda Oblast
Petukhovo, Vashkinsky District, Vologda Oblast, a village in Kisnemsky Selsoviet of Vashkinsky District in Vologda Oblast
Petukhovo, Danilovsky District, Yaroslavl Oblast, a village in Fedurinsky Rural Okrug of Danilovsky District in Yaroslavl Oblast
Petukhovo, Pereslavsky District, Yaroslavl Oblast, a village in Zagoryevsky Rural Okrug of Pereslavsky District in Yaroslavl Oblast
Petukhovo, Uglichsky District, Yaroslavl Oblast, a village in Ilyinsky Rural Okrug of Uglichsky District in Yaroslavl Oblast

Alternative names
Petukhovo, alternative name of Petukhovy, a village in Karpushinsky Rural Okrug of Kotelnichsky District in Kirov Oblast; 
Petukhovo, alternative name of Petukhi, a selo in Petukhovsky Selsoviet of Klyuchevsky District in Altai Krai;

See also
Petukhovsky (disambiguation)